Charak (also Romanized as Chārak; also known as Shārak) is a village in Khvormuj Rural District, in the Central District of Dashti County, Bushehr Province, Iran. At the 2006 census, its population was 760, with 171 families.

References 

Populated places in Dashti County